Sherri Duskey Rinker is a bestseller author from Illinois. Her works include the picture books Steam Train and Goodnight Construction Site series and novels Revver the Speedway Squirrel and its sequel.

Biography
For 25 years, Rinker worked as a graphic designer. She credits Virginia Lee Burton and her grandmother for her passion for picture books. AG Ford is the illustrator or Rinker's children's books.

Rinker had a difficult early life. She lives in St. Charles, Illinois, with her husband and children.

Works

Middle Grade novels
Revver the Speedway Squirrel
Revver the Speedway Squirrel: The Big Race Home

Picture books
Roto and Roy: Helicopter Heroes
Joy Ride
Construction Site: Road Crew, Coming Through!
It's So Quiet: A Not-Quite-Going-To-Bed Book
Construction Site Mission: Demolition!
How To Put An Octopus To Bed
Three Cheers For Kid McGear!
Celebrate You!
Construction Site On Christmas Night
Tiny And The Big Dig
The 12 Sleighs Of Christmas
Big Machines
Mighty, Mighty Construction Site
Silly Wonderful You
Steam Train, Dream Train
Goodnight, Goodnight, Construction Site

Board books
Construction Site: Spring Delight
Construction Site: Merry and Bright
Cement Mixer's ABC
Excavator's 123
Dump Truck's Colors
Bulldozer’s Shapes
Crane Truck's Opposites
Let's Go!
Steam Train, Dream Train Colors
Steam Train, Dream Train 1-2-3

References

Writers from Illinois
Year of birth missing (living people)
21st-century American writers
American children's writers
American women children's writers
People from St. Charles, Illinois
Living people